OpusPoint Partners, LLC is an investment advisory firm specializing in healthcare and life sciences.

Background

Founded in 2009 by Michael S. Weiss and Lindsay A. Rosenwald, MD, the firm acts as the investment manager for some portfolio private hedge funds in the healthcare and biotechnology sectors.

In October 2010, OpusPoint invested approximately $3 million into National Holdings Corporation and formed a joint venture. As a result, a new investment banking firm, OPN Capital Markets, was established to leverage the resources of both companies.

Among others, OpusPoint Partners participated in the private placement for such companies as Sunesis Pharmaceuticals, Inc. that developed Voreloxin, an anticancer drug used in acute myeloid leukemia.

References

External links 
 

Investment companies of the United States
Money managers
Financial services companies based in New York City
Financial services companies established in 2009
Investment management companies of the United States